Podleśny may refer to:

Places in Poland
Ignacew Podleśny
Łopiennik Podleśny
Śladków Podleśny

People
Damian Podleśny, Polish footballer